Kristina Persson-Nordlander (born 12 May 1969) is a Swedish archer. She competed at the 1992 Summer Olympics, the 1996 Summer Olympics and the 2000 Summer Olympics.

References

External links
 

1969 births
Living people
Swedish female archers
Olympic archers of Sweden
Archers at the 1992 Summer Olympics
Archers at the 1996 Summer Olympics
Archers at the 2000 Summer Olympics
People from Sundsvall
Sportspeople from Västernorrland County
20th-century Swedish women